Mistake Peak is a snowy peak, about  high, rising  west-southwest of Shapeless Mountain, at the south end of the Willett Range in Victoria Land, Antarctica. It was so named in 1957 by the New Zealand Northern Survey Party of the Commonwealth Trans-Antarctic Expedition (1956–58), because they mistakenly climbed the mountain in the belief they were on Shapeless Mountain.

References

Mountains of Victoria Land
Scott Coast
Willett Range